Opus Mar is the second studio album by Canadian rock band Sumo Cyco, released on 31 March 2017.

The band has released music videos for "Anti-Anthem" "Move Mountains", "Sleep Tight", and "Free Yourself".

Track listing
All songs written by Skye Sweetnam and Matt Drake except "Move Mountains" (Sweetnam, Drake, Webbe).

References

2017 albums
Sumo Cyco albums